The International Congregational Council was a worldwide association of Congregational Churches that was founded in 1891 and merged with the Alliance of the Reformed Churches Throughout the World Holding the Presbyterian Order to form the World Alliance of Reformed Churches.

Background and First Council 

The idea for a world Congregational congress was first mooted in 1874 by Dr. Hastings Ross in an article entitled "An Ecumenical Council of Congregational Churches in Congregational Quarterly. His article was widely distributed in the United States, Canada and Great Britain. The idea was discussed at the 1880 Triennial Council of the Congregational Churches in the United States and on June 7, 1884 the Congregational Union of Ontario and Quebec approved the idea at its annual meeting in Montreal. The Canadian resolution asked the Congregational Union of England and Wales to consider the feasibility of such a meeting. The Congregational Union of England and Wales approved the idea, but practical steps to the congress only came after the Congregational Union of New South Wales approved the idea at a meeting in Melbourne in 1888. Two requests for a convention were formally presented to the Congregational Union of England and Wales in May 1889 and official adopted by the union. In October of that year the American Congregationalist unanimously approved the idea of the gathering at its Triennial Council in Worcester, Massachusetts, after being formally invited by the English. After much correspondence and deliberations by arrangement committees the First International Congregational Council opened in London at Memorial Hall on July 13, 1891. The Council finished its work on July 21, and an arrangements committee was set up to work with the National Council of the US Congregational Churches to convent the next Council in that country

Subsequent Councils 

After the initial Council in London nine additional International Councils were held

Second, held in Boston September 20–29, 1899
Third, held in Edinburgh, June 30 - July 9, 1908
Fourth, held in Boston June 29-July 6, 1920
Fifth, held in Bournemouth, England July 1–8, 1930
Sixth held at Wellesley College, Wellesley, Massachusetts June 17–24, 1949.
Seventh held at St. Andrews University, Scotland 20–29 June 1953.
Eighth, held in Hartford, Connecticut 2–10 July 1958
Ninth, held in Rotterdam, Netherlands on 4–12 July 1962
Tenth, held in Swansea, Wales 7–11 July 1966 

The International Congregational Council merged with the Alliance of Reformed Churches throughout the World holding the Presbyterian System to found the World Alliance of Reformed Churches (Presbyterian and Congregational) at a Uniting General Council held in Nairobi, Kenya August 20–30, 1970.

References 

Congregationalism
International bodies of Reformed denominations
Religious organizations established in 1891
Religious organizations disestablished in 1970
Congregational organizations established in the 19th century